The 1910 municipal election was held December 12, 1910 for the purpose of electing a mayor and five aldermen to sit on the Edmonton City Council, as well as three public school trustees and five separate school trustees.  There were also four proposed bylaws put to a vote of the electorate concurrently with the election.

Positions to be elected

There were eight aldermen on city council, but three of the positions were already filled: James Hyndman, John H. Millar, and James Mould had been elected to two-year terms in 1909 and were still in office.  George S. Armstrong had also been elected to a two-year term, but had resigned to run for mayor.  Accordingly, the fifth-place finisher in the 1910 election - James McKinley - was elected to a one-year term to complete Armstrong's aldermanic term.

There were six trustees on the public board of trustees, but three of the positions were already occupied: A Butchart, Arthur Cushing, and William Ferris had been elected to two-year terms in 1909 and were still in office.

Voter turnout

There were 2149 ballots cast.  Information about the number of eligible voters is no longer available.

Results

(bold indicates elected, italics indicate incumbent)

Mayor

George S. Armstrong was acclaimed as mayor.

Aldermen

John Lundy - 854
Thomas Grindley - 670
Herman McInnes - 616
Charles Gowan - 601
James McKinley - 570
Alex Stuart - 530
J C MacDonald - 525
A E Potter - 429
Charles Gibbs - 369
Gustave May - 251
F C Humberstone - 122

Public school trustees

Walter Ramsey - 813
William Clark - 658
Samuel Barnes - 563
Harry Smith - 498
E T Bishop - 355
J St. Clair-Blackett - 263

Separate (Catholic) school trustees

John Cashman, James Collisson. Wilfrid Gariépy, Milton Martin, and Joseph Henri Picard were elected.  Detailed results are no longer available.

Bylaws

The following bylaws were voted on concurrently with the 1910 election:

Bylaw 279
A bylaw to grant Pinisch Compressing Co., a special franchise for the supply of artificial gas for the lighting of railway coaches.
For: 1,239
Against: 245

Bylaw 280
A bylaw to provide for the sum of $75,000 to supplement the sum of $75,000 granted by bylaw 248 for improving East End Park and Exhibition Grounds.
For: 1,557
Against: 184

Bylaw 281
A bylaw to provide for the raising of the further sum of $175,000 to be paid to the City Hospital by way of a bonus.
For: 1,610
Against: 196

Bylaw 282
A bylaw to provide $2,300 for the purchase of machinery and an addition to the City Warehouse.
For: 1,188
Against: 459

References

City of Edmonton: Edmonton Elections

1910
1910 elections in Canada
1910 in Alberta